The Potter County Courthouse is a government building for Potter County, located in the county seat of Amarillo, Texas. It was listed on the National Register of Historic Places on August 22, 1996.

History 
The art deco styled courthouse was designed by William C. Townes and was built in 1932. The courthouse cost $315,000 ($ in  dollars) to build.

The Potter County Library, which sits on the same property as the courthouse, was also designed by Townes and was built in 1922.

See also 

National Register of Historic Places listings in Potter County, Texas
Recorded Texas Historic Landmarks in Potter County

References 

Government buildings completed in 1932
Art Deco architecture in Texas
County courthouses in Texas
Courthouses on the National Register of Historic Places in Texas
Buildings and structures in Amarillo, Texas
Art Deco courthouses
National Register of Historic Places in Potter County, Texas
Recorded Texas Historic Landmarks